Cerveza Zillertal is a beer brand from Uruguay. Its flagship is a pilsner  lager, and the brand also produces IPAs and Scottish-style red beer. 
The brand name is a reference to the town Zillertal in Tyrol, Austria.

References

Uruguayan alcoholic drinks
AB InBev
Multinational breweries
Beer in Argentina